Emmental District in the Canton of Bern was created on 1 January 2010. It is part of the Emmental-Oberaargau administrative region.

Mergers and name changes
On 1 January 2016, the former municipalities of Oberösch and Niederösch merged into Ersigen.
On 1 January 2021 the former municipality of Mötschwil merged into Hindelbank.

References

Districts of the canton of Bern